Hermenegildo Palacio Cantero (born 13 April 1956) is a Cuban rower. He competed at the 1976 Summer Olympics and the 1980 Summer Olympics.

References

External links
 

1956 births
Living people
Cuban male rowers
Olympic rowers of Cuba
Rowers at the 1976 Summer Olympics
Rowers at the 1980 Summer Olympics
Place of birth missing (living people)
Pan American Games gold medalists for Cuba
Pan American Games medalists in rowing
Rowers at the 1979 Pan American Games
Medalists at the 1979 Pan American Games
20th-century Cuban people
21st-century Cuban people